Iran, officially the Islamic Republic of Iran, is a country in Western Asia.

Iran may also refer to:

Places 
Pahlavi Iran, officially known as the Imperial State of Persia (1925–1935), and then the Imperial State of Iran (1935–1979)
Qajar Iran, officially known as the Sublime State of Persia (1789–1925)
Safavid Iran, officially known as the Safavid Empire (1501–1736)
Greater Iran, refers to the regions that have significant Iranian cultural influence
Iranian plateau
Īrānwīj
Iran, the alternate name of the village of Irancheh in Iran
Iranshahr (city)
Iran Mountains, a range of mountains on the island of Borneo
Iran Kharab, a fortified camp founded by Iranian ruler Nader Shah in Dagestan (present-day Russia)

Media 
Islamic Republic of Iran Broadcasting
National Iranian Radio and Television
Iran (newspaper)

Music 
Ey Iran, a famous and popular anthem in Iran
"Iran Iran", a popular single by Mohammad Nouri

Transport 
Iran Air Tours
Iran Aseman Airlines
Iranian Air Transport
Iran Air

People
 Iran (given name), list of people with the name

Iranian studies 
Iranian studies
Iranian peoples
Iranian languages
Iranica

Other uses 
Iran (word)
Iranistan, a Moorish Revival mansion in the U.S. city of Bridgeport, Connecticut
IRAN, an international military/technical acronym for "Inspect, Repair As Necessary", a term to describe scheduled refurbishment inspections of products and equipment to prevent future failure, see Project High Wire

See also 

Name of Iran
Outline of Iran
List of Iran-related topics
New Iran Party (disambiguation)
Irani (disambiguation)
Persia (disambiguation)
Persian (disambiguation)